is a Japanese cloisonné making company located in Sakae, Nagoya, central Japan.

History 

Owari province was one of the foremost production centres of enamel in the country. During the Edo period the Andō family operated a pipe shop called "Murata-ya". Andō Jubei (Jusaburo) (1876-1953) was born in Nagoya as the fourth child; he had three elder sisters. His mother died in May 1877 following an illness, and his father followed in September 1877. Orphaned at less than one year old, he was raised according to his father’s will by staff employers. His older sister married Andō Juzaemon, whose born name was Matsukichi. Together with his brother-in-law they made the cloisonné company a success. In 1893, Andō Juzaemon went to the World's Columbian Exposition in Chicago. It was his first time to travel overseas, and he used the opportunity to study the market. In 1901 Andō Jubei went to the Glasgow International Exhibition, which was his first overseas travel, and he stayed for two years in a British home to study the market.

After they returned to Japan, they invited Kawade Shibatarō (1856–1921) as head of the studio, who further developed plique-à-jour. Cloisonné experienced strong growth around the time of the Paris Exposition Universelle in 1900. Japanese enamel work became sought after in the west and sourced many pieces from Toshima, which is the origin of Owari cloisonne.

As of 1918, at least fifty cloisonné artists worked there. The company was given an Imperial Warrant of Appointment to the Japanese court. Ando cloisonné was also presented as state gifts. Manchukuo Prime Minister Zheng Xiaoxu (1860-1938) wrote four Chinese characters in calligraphy in praise of a vase that was presented to him as a gift.

It entered a cooperation with the watches maker Seiko to produce the dial for the limited edition "Presage" in 2018.

It is one of the very few traditional cloisonné companies still left in Japan.
The main store in Sakae has a small museum with objects by the Ando company and also Namikawa. Objects from Ando are held in the collection of the Walters Art Museum and in the Victoria and Albert Museum.

Types 
Shipōyaki is a kind of cloisonné, in which the base is covered by enamel and fused. The different types and techniques which are the marks of Ando include:

 Musen shippō (無線七宝) wireless cloisonné, enamel is applied to the body or to the wire while being painted, the wire is then removed before firing the object 
 Yūsen shippō (有線七宝) wired cloisonné with silver, a typical technique from Owari province
 Moriage shippō (盛上七宝) is raised cloisonné above the wires. Kawade Shibataro was a master in this area, producing wares for the Tokyo Imperial Palace.
 Tōtai shippō  (透胎七宝) parts are cut into an object’s body, then filled with semi-translucent or translucent enamel resembling stained glass
 Shōtai shippō (省胎七宝) uses translucent enamels applied through yūsen shippō, but the metal is then dissolved in nitric acid
 Saiyū shippō / tsuiki shippō (彩釉七宝 / 鎚起七宝) is when the vessel has raised contours that have been hammered out, with coloured cloisonné applied on it
 Émail shippō (エマイル七宝), the term is a composite of the French term for enamel and the Japanese term, which is basically a double glaze to prevent corrosion
 Dōtai shippō (銅胎七宝) copper enamels
 Gintai shippō (銀胎七宝) sterling silver enamels
 Tōmeiyū shippō (透明釉七宝) transparent enamels
 Han-tōmeiyū shippō (半透明釉七宝) translucent or semi-transparent enamels
 Fu-tōmeiyū shippō (不透明釉七宝) opaque enamels

See also 
 Kin'unken, a cloisonné company in Kyoto

References

External links 

 Official Website

Vitreous enamel
Manufacturing companies based in Nagoya
Japanese brands
Sakae, Nagoya